Dollman's spiny rat or Dollman’s Sulawesi Maxomys (Maxomys dollmani) is a species of rodent in the family Muridae.
It is found only on Sulawesi.

References

Maxomys
Mammals described in 1941
Taxonomy articles created by Polbot
Endemic fauna of Indonesia
Rodents of Indonesia